Tom McCullough (born 22 September 1975) is a British Formula One engineer. He is currently the performance director at the Aston Martin Formula One team.

Career
McCullough spent his time at University competing in amateur motorsport, participating in some Formula Ford 2000 events. Following three years in Formula Ford, McCullough decided that he was more cut out to be an engineer rather than a driver and therefore he began his motorsport engineering career at Reynard Motorsport working on Le Mans projects for Panoz and Cadillac. This gave McCullough hands-on experience to complement his Automotive Engineering studies. He then focussed on Reynard's IndyCar projects in the late 1990s, joining the research and development department.

When Reynard ceased to exist in 2002, McCullough joined Formula One working for Williams Racing, originally working as a data engineer before moving on to become a race engineer. He spent several seasons with the team, working with the likes of Nico Hülkenberg, Rubens Barrichello and Bruno Senna, before leaving Williams at the end of 2012. Following a brief spell at Sauber as head of track engineering in 2013, he returned to the UK from Switzerland, heading up the trackside engineering office at the Force India team. Under McCullough's oversight, the Silverstone-based team has had immense success, including Force India's historic fourth-place finishes in 2016 and 2017 and a victory for Racing Point in 2020 in which the team also finished in fourth.

McCullough's current role at the newly named Aston Martin squad, consists of extracting the maximum performance out of both cars on any given weekend. He works very closely with the engineering teams on both sides of the Aston Martin garage and the performance groups back in the factory to ensure that both cars benefit from the best available information at a race weekend.

References

Living people
British motorsport people
Formula One engineers
Williams Grand Prix Engineering
1975 births